The Rochester Mayoral Election of 2009 took place on November 3, 2009 in the City of Rochester, New York, United States. Democratic Mayor Robert Duffy, first elected in 2005, ran unopposed and was re-elected Mayor, with a low 19.5% turnout. Duffy announced his re-election bid March 21, 2009. No Republican showed serious interest in challenging Duffy.

In November 2010, Duffy was elected Lieutenant Governor of New York.

Results

References

Rochester
Rochester mayoral
2009
2009